Grand Cess is a town in Grand Kru County, Liberia.

Populated places in Liberia
Grand Kru County